The Montreux/Berlin Concerts is a double album by American jazz saxophonist Anthony Braxton recorded in 1975 and 1976 and released on the Arista label. Sides 1-3 were subsequently released on CD as Anthony Braxton Live in 1987 and all tracks were included on The Complete Arista Recordings of Anthony Braxton released by Mosaic Records in 2008.

Reception
The Allmusic review by Scott Yanow awarded the album 5 stars stating "the interplay between these masterful musicians (making expert use of space and dynamics) sometimes borders on miraculous... this music is highly recommended and by itself demonstrates the greatness and uniqueness of Anthony Braxton's music".

Track listing
All compositions by Anthony Braxton.

 "Z WBN D3B" - 8:50   
 "H-46M...B-BW4" - 3:07   
 "84 Deg. -Kelvin - 6" - 7:03   
 "72 Deg. -Kelvin..L" - 6:33   
 "337-4 46842 BFG-12" - 8:18   
 "CM=B05-7" - 5:29
 "29 M 36" - 23:44 Omitted from the 1987 CD rerelease

Recorded at the Montreux Jazz Festival in Switzerland on 20 July 1975 (tracks 1–3), and at the Berlin Jazz Days in Germany on November 4, 1976 (tracks 4–6) and November 6, 1976 (track 7).

Personnel
Anthony Braxton - sopranino saxophone, alto saxophone, contrabass clarinet, flute
Kenny Wheeler - trumpet (tracks 1–3)
George Lewis - trombone (tracks 4–7)
Dave Holland - bass (tracks 1–6)
Barry Altschul - drums, percussion, gongs (tracks 1–6)
The Berlin New Music Group conducted by Gerald Humel (track 7)

References

Arista Records albums
Anthony Braxton live albums
1977 albums